The Shadow of Silk Lennox is a 1935 American gangster film directed by Ray Kirkwood and Jack Nelson and starring Lon Chaney Jr before his breakthrough into horror films.

Plot summary 
John Arthur Lennox is an underworld chieftain who runs a nightclub where society patrons come to rub elbows with the criminal set. He is nicknamed Silk because of his fondness for the expression that things are "fine as silk". From the club he directs a violent $50,000 bank heist and cheekily invites in two detectives to establish his alibi. While the robbery is going on, he gets his new singer Jimmy Lambert to play a recording over the intercom that makes it appear as if his men are on the premises.

When Deacon, the gangster holding the stolen money, tries to skip town, Silk has him killed at the train station. The money is not found on his body, but the gang suspects that it is hidden in the express office. Meanwhile, Jimmy has realised that the recording will help convict Silk of the robbery and with Nola, the dance partner in his act, plans to use it against him.

As the law closes in and his allies turn against him, Silk is arrested but has to be released when witnesses, afraid of reprisals, refuse to identify him. In the police line-up, Silk meets Fingers Smalley, who agrees to break open the express office safe. After establishing an alibi at the club, Silk and Fingers leave for the office, but the police arrive as Fingers opens the safe. Silk is killed during the ensuing gunfight and Fingers explains that he is really an undercover police agent named Ferguson.

Differences from original story

Cast 
Lon Chaney Jr. as John Arthur "Silk" Lennox
Dean Benton as Jimmy Lambert
Marie Burton as Nola Travers
Jack Mulhall as Ferguson, alias "Fingers" Farley
Eddie Gribbon as Henchman Lefty Sloan
Larry McGrath
Allen Greer as Henchman Dutch
Theodore Lorch as Kennedy, the ward-heeler
Frank Niemann as Nightclub Band Leader

Soundtrack 
"Love Is In the Way" (Words and music by Dean Benton)
"Forgotten Melodies" (Words and music by Dean Benton)
"Walkin' in the Dark" (Words and music by Dean Benton)

External links 

1935 films
1935 crime drama films
American black-and-white films
American crime drama films
Commodore Pictures films
Films directed by Jack Nelson
1930s English-language films
1930s American films